The Turner Cup was the championship trophy of the International Hockey League from 1945 to 2001 and the renamed United Hockey League from 2007 to 2010. The Cup was named for Joe Turner, a goaltender from Windsor, Ontario. Turner became professional with the Detroit Red Wings organization, and played one season with the Indianapolis Capitals in the American Hockey League. Turner was killed in Belgium during World War II, while serving with the United States Army.

It was the championship trophy to the incarnation of the IHL that existed from 1945 to 2001 before it was retired to the Hockey Hall of Fame. In July 2007, the United Hockey League officially changed its name to "International Hockey League". The new IHL put forth a request to the Hockey Hall of Fame to take a controlling interest in the Turner Cup. The name Turner Cup was restored on September 24, 2007 as a tribute to the original IHL. When the incarnation of the IHL that existed from 2007 to 2010 folded, the Cup was retired again and looked to be put back in the Hockey Hall of Fame.

Champions and finalists

Championships by franchise

References
 Turner Cup champions www.azhockey.com

External links 
Intotheboards.net Playoffs

International Hockey League (1945–2001) trophies